The 6th season of Jak oni śpiewają, the Polish edition of Soapstar Superstar, started on September 12, 2009, and ended on November 21, 2009. It was broadcast by Polsat. Katarzyna Cichopek and Krzysztof Ibisz continued as the hosts, and the judges were: Edyta Górniak, Elżbieta Zapendowska and Rudi Schuberth.

Stars

Scores

Red numbers indicate the lowest score for each week.
Green numbers indicate the highest score for each week.
 indicates the star eliminated that week.
 indicates the returning stars that finished in the bottom two.
 indicates the star who has got immunitet.
 indicates the star withdrew.

The Best Score (6.0)

Average Chart

Episodes

Week 1
Individual judges scores in charts below (given in parentheses) are listed in this order from left to right: Edyta Górniak, Rudi Schuberth, Elżbieta Zapendowska

Running order

Week 2
Individual judges scores in charts below (given in parentheses) are listed in this order from left to right: Edyta Górniak, Rudi Schuberth, Elżbieta Zapendowska

Running order

Week 3
Individual judges scores in charts below (given in parentheses) are listed in this order from left to right: Edyta Górniak, Rudi Schuberth, Elżbieta Zapendowska

Running order

Week 4
Individual judges scores in charts below (given in parentheses) are listed in this order from left to right: Edyta Górniak, Rudi Schuberth, Elżbieta Zapendowska

Running order

Week 5
Individual judges scores in charts below (given in parentheses) are listed in this order from left to right: Edyta Górniak, Rudi Schuberth, Elżbieta Zapendowska

Running order

Running order

Week 6
Individual judges scores in charts below (given in parentheses) are listed in this order from left to right: Edyta Górniak, Rudi Schuberth, Elżbieta Zapendowska

Running order

Song Chart

 Not scored
 Highest scoring
 Lowest scoring

Rating Figures

6
2009 Polish television seasons
2009 in television